Barbara Scofield (born June 24, 1926) is an American former tennis player.

Scofield learned playing tennis at age 11 by taking lesson at the Golden Gate Park.

With the Argentine Enrique Morea, Scofield won the mixed doubles at the French Championships in 1950, and the following year, she was a runner-up in the women's doubles event with Beryl Bartlett.

Scofield‘s best singles result at the Wimbledon Championships was reaching the quarterfinals in 1950, losing to third-seeded Doris Hart. In the doubles event, she reached the semifinals in 1948 and 1951, partnering Helen Rihbany and Betty Rosenquest respectively.

Scofield won the singles title at the 1955 Eastern Grass Court Championships in South Orange, New Jersey.

Scofield was inducted into the United States Tennis Association Hall of Fame in 2013.

Grand Slam finals

Doubles: (1 runner-up)

Mixed doubles: (1 title)

Grand Slam singles tournament timeline

References

External links
 
 Wimbledon player record

1926 births
Living people
American female tennis players
French Championships (tennis) champions
Grand Slam (tennis) champions in mixed doubles
Tennis players from San Francisco
21st-century American women